Children First, Offenders Second (CFOS) is a progressive and positive youth justice model that consists of eight principles. The model is structured to make a child the focus of any responses that are made, in view of their offending behavior.

Principles
 Child-friendly and child-appropriate treatment
 Diversionary action - not punishment, justice, or welfare-based
 Prevention as inclusive
 Evidence-based partnership
 Kindness - not labels or stigma
 Systems management - not unprincipled net-widening
 Partnership with the state
 Placing responsibility with the adult and not the child

"Children First, Offenders Second", also known as "positive youth justice", challenges what its authors view as outdated, punitive, stigmatizing and unethical models of youth justice. It focuses on the use of risk factor paradigms in risk-based youth justice.

References

Sources
  
 
 

 

Criminal justice